Fredericton West-Hanwell is a provincial electoral district for the Legislative Assembly of New Brunswick, Canada. It was first contested in the 2014 general election, having been created in the 2013 redistribution of electoral boundaries by combining portions of the Fredericton-Silverwood and York electoral districts.

The district includes the southwestern part of the City of Fredericton as well as two adjacent communities: Hanwell and Kingsclear, and the Kingsclear First Nation.

Members of the Legislative Assembly

Election results

References

External links 
Website of the Legislative Assembly of New Brunswick
Map of riding as of 2018

New Brunswick provincial electoral districts
Politics of Fredericton